McCarthy (also spelled MacCarthy or McCarty) may refer to:

 MacCarthy, a Gaelic Irish clan
 McCarthy, Alaska, United States
 McCarty, Missouri, United States
 McCarthy Road, a road in Alaska
 McCarthy (band), an indie pop band
 Château MacCarthy, a Bordeaux wine
 McCarthy Tétrault, a Canadian law firm
 McCarthy evaluation, programming-language semantics also called short-circuit evaluation
 McCarty Creek, a stream in Missouri, United States
 McCarthy Scales of Children's Abilities, a psychological test given to young children
McCarthy-Dundon, an Irish roadman gang

People
 McCarthy (surname)

See also
McCarthyism, a practice of making accusations, named after U.S. Senator Joseph McCarthy